The 12th Canadian Folk Music Awards were presented in Toronto, Ontario on December 3, 2016.

Nominees and recipients
Recipients are listed first and highlighted in boldface.

References

External links
Canadian Folk Music Awards

12
Canadian Folk Music Awards
Canadian Folk Music Awards
Canadian Folk Music Awards
Canadian Folk Music Awards